No. 132 Wing RAF was a formation of the Royal Air Force during the Second World War. It comprised No. 66 Squadron RAF, No. 127 Squadron RAF, No. 322 Squadron RAF, No. 331 Squadron RAF and No. 332 Squadron RAF.

See also
 List of Wings of the Royal Air Force

References

Wings of the Royal Air Force in the Second World War
Military units and formations disestablished in the 1940s